Gohyeon-dong is the central dong within the city of Geoje-si.  The City Hall, stadium, Intercity bus terminal, and many businesses and homes are located there.  When Geoje City is mentioned, it usually refers to Gohyeon-dong or Jangpyeong-dong.

Points of Interest include
 Geoje POW Camp
 Gohyeon fortress

External links
Official website

Geoje
Neighbourhoods in South Korea